Bear Creek, also known as Bear Hollow Creek,
is a  tributary of the Yellow River of Iowa, originating in Jefferson Township, near Rossville in Allamakee County. It parallels Allamakee County Road X26 (Rossville/Monona Road). It enters the Yellow River near Volney, approximately where the state of Iowa maintains the Yellow River Valley Canoe and Heritage Trail in Allamakee County.

See also
List of rivers of Iowa

Sources

Rivers of Iowa
Rivers of Allamakee County, Iowa
Rivers of Clayton County, Iowa